William Joseph Lambart Sladen MBE (19 December 1920 – 29 May 2017) was a Welsh American naturalist who was an Antarctic explorer and a specialist on polar bird life. He was professor emeritus at Johns Hopkins University in the United States. He researched the mating of Antarctic birds and received the Polar Medal. Two mountains on the continent, Mount Sladen and Sladen Summit, are named in his honour. His discovery in the 1960s that DDT residues could be found in adelie penguins contributed to the banning of DDT in the U.S.

Sladen was born in Wales and trained in medicinewith an MD from London and a Ph.D. in zoology from Oxford and joined a research team to the Antarctic in 1948 as part of the  Falkland Islands Dependencies Survey. The expedition required him to live alone  and sledge with dogs after his colleagues were killed in a fire. He moved to the United States in 1956 and taught behaviour and ecology at the Johns Hopkins University School of Public Health. He worked with the US Antarctic Research Program and undertook studies on diseases in wild birds. He detected DDT traces in Antarctic penguins in 1964 and influenced the EPA's ban on the pesticide. Sladen worked on Wrangel Island in cooperation with Soviet scientists. In the 1970s he studied Tundra swans and advised the US Airforce. A film on his studies Penguin City was produced in 1971 with narration by Charles Kuralt and broadcast by CBS. In the 1980s he worked with Bill Lishman to train Canada geese to follow ultralight aircraft. This would later inspire the movie Fly Away Home (1996). He retired to Fauquier County in 1990 and established a research station north of Warrenton where he worked and lived until his death. He is survived by his wife, the former Jocelyn Arundel, his two children, Kate Adélie Sladen and Hugh Sladen, and two grandchildren, Evan and Dillon Bush.

References 

1920 births
2017 deaths
Welsh naturalists
Members of the Order of the British Empire
People from Newport, Wales
Welsh biologists
20th-century Welsh medical doctors
Welsh zoologists
Alumni of the University of Oxford
Johns Hopkins University faculty
Recipients of the Polar Medal
British emigrants to the United States